The 2006 MTV Video Music Awards aired live on August 31, 2006, honoring the best music videos from June 11, 2005, to June 26, 2006. The show was hosted by Jack Black at Radio City Music Hall in New York City.

The 2006 Video Music Awards marked the first time viewers were able to vote for all performers' categories (Best Video; Best Male, Female, and Group Videos; and genre categories). Like previous years, the artistic categories (Best Direction, Best Cinematography, etc.) are still chosen by music industry professionals. The 2006 Awards also discontinued the major category Breakthrough Video.

The show was criticized by fans and viewers as being uninteresting or lacking substance. The award ceremony's ratings were down 28% from the 8 million viewers it averaged in 2005 and down 45% from the 10.3 million viewers it averaged in 2004.

Shakira and Red Hot Chili Peppers received the most nominations, with seven each. Avenged Sevenfold won Best New Artist and "I Write Sins Not Tragedies", by Panic! at the Disco, became the first video to win Video of the Year without winning a single other award since "This Note's for You" by Neil Young in 1989.

Awards
Winners are in bold text

Video of the Year
Panic! at the Disco – "I Write Sins Not Tragedies"
 Christina Aguilera – "Ain't No Other Man" 
 Madonna – "Hung Up"
 Red Hot Chili Peppers – "Dani California"
 Shakira (featuring Wyclef Jean) – "Hips Don't Lie"

Best Male Video
James Blunt – "You're Beautiful"
 Busta Rhymes (featuring Mary J. Blige, Rah Digga, Missy Elliott, Lloyd Banks, Papoose, and DMX) – "Touch It Remix"
 Nick Lachey – "What's Left of Me"
 T.I. – "What You Know"
 Kanye West (featuring Jamie Foxx) – "Gold Digger"

Best Female Video
Kelly Clarkson – "Because of You"
Christina Aguilera – "Ain't No Other Man"
 Nelly Furtado (featuring Timbaland) – "Promiscuous"
 Madonna – "Hung Up"
 Shakira (featuring Wyclef Jean) – "Hips Don't Lie"

Best Group Video
The All-American Rejects – "Move Along"
 Fall Out Boy – "Dance, Dance"
 Gnarls Barkley – "Crazy"
 Panic! at the Disco – "I Write Sins Not Tragedies"
 Red Hot Chili Peppers – "Dani California"

Best New Artist in a Video
Avenged Sevenfold – "Bat Country"
 Angels & Airwaves – "The Adventure"
 James Blunt – "You're Beautiful"
 Chris Brown (featuring Juelz Santana) – "Run It!"
 Panic! at the Disco – "I Write Sins Not Tragedies"
 Rihanna – "SOS"

Best Pop Video
P!nk – "Stupid Girls"
 Christina Aguilera – "Ain't No Other Man
 Nelly Furtado (featuring Timbaland) – "Promiscuous"
 Madonna – "Hung Up"
 Shakira (featuring Wyclef Jean) – "Hips Don't Lie"

Best Rock Video
AFI – "Miss Murder"
 Green Day – "Wake Me Up When September Ends"
 Panic! at the Disco – "I Write Sins Not Tragedies"
 Red Hot Chili Peppers – "Dani California"
 Thirty Seconds to Mars – "The Kill"

Best R&B Video
Beyoncé (featuring Slim Thug and Bun B) – "Check on It"
 Mary J. Blige – "Be Without You"
 Chris Brown – "Yo (Excuse Me Miss)"
 Mariah Carey – "Shake It Off"
 Jamie Foxx (featuring Ludacris) – "Unpredictable"

Best Rap Video
Chamillionaire (featuring Krayzie Bone) – "Ridin'"
 50 Cent – "Window Shopper"
 Busta Rhymes (featuring Mary J. Blige, Rah Digga, Missy Elliott, Lloyd Banks, Papoose, and DMX) – "Touch It (Remix)"
 T.I. – "What You Know"
 Yung Joc (featuring Nitti) – "It's Goin' Down"

Best Hip-Hop Video
The Black Eyed Peas – "My Humps"
 Common – "Testify"
 Daddy Yankee – "Rompe"
 Three 6 Mafia (featuring Young Buck, 8Ball and MJG) – "Stay Fly"
 Kanye West (featuring Jamie Foxx) – "Gold Digger"

Best Dance Video
The Pussycat Dolls (featuring Snoop Dogg) – "Buttons"
 Nelly Furtado (featuring Timbaland) – "Promiscuous"
 Madonna – "Hung Up"
 Sean Paul – "Temperature"
 Shakira (featuring Wyclef Jean) – "Hips Don't Lie"

Best Direction in a Video
Gnarls Barkley – "Crazy" (Director: Robert Hales)
 10 Years – "Wasteland" (Director: Kevin Kerslake)
 AFI – "Miss Murder" (Director: Marc Webb)
 Common – "Testify" (Director: Anthony Mandler)
 Red Hot Chili Peppers – "Dani California" (Director: Tony Kaye)

Best Choreography in a Video
Shakira (featuring Wyclef Jean) – "Hips Don't Lie" (Choreographer: Shakira)
 Christina Aguilera – "Ain't No Other Man" (Choreographer: Jeri Slaughter)
 Madonna – "Hung Up" (Choreographer: Stefanie Roos)
 Sean Paul – "Temperature" (Choreographer: Tanisha Scott)
  The Pussycat Dolls (featuring Snoop Dogg) – "Buttons" (Choreographer: Mikey Minden)

Best Special Effects in a Video
Missy Elliott – "We Run This" (Special Effects: Louis Mackall and Tonia Wallander)
 Angels & Airwaves – "The Adventure" (Special Effects: Jack Effects)
 Beck – "Hell Yes" (Special Effects: Hammer & Tongs)
 Pearl Jam – "Life Wasted" (Special Effects: Fernando Apodaca)
 U2 – "Original of the Species" (Special Effects: John Leamy and Lawrence Nimrichter)

Best Art Direction in a Video
Red Hot Chili Peppers – "Dani California" (Art Director: Justin Dragonas)
 10 Years – "Wasteland" (Art Director: Trae King)
 Common – "Testify" (Art Director: David Ross)
 Panic! at the Disco – "I Write Sins Not Tragedies" (Art Directors: Lindy McMichael, Jamie Drake and Erin Wieczorek)
 Shakira (featuring Wyclef Jean) – "Hips Don't Lie" (Art Director: Laura Fox)

Best Editing in a Video
Gnarls Barkley – "Crazy" (Editor: Ken Mowe)
 The All-American Rejects – "Move Along" (Editor: J.D. Smyth)
 Angels & Airwaves – "The Adventure" (Editor: Clark Eddy)
 Red Hot Chili Peppers – "Dani California" (Editor: Peter Goddard)
 U2 – "Original of the Species" (Editor: Olivier Wicki)

Best Cinematography in a Video
James Blunt – "You're Beautiful" (Director of Photography: Robbie Ryan)
 AFI – "Miss Murder" (Director of Photography: Welles Hackett)
 Prince – "Black Sweat" (Director of Photography: Checco Varese)
 Red Hot Chili Peppers – "Dani California" (Director of Photography: Tony Kaye)
 Ashlee Simpson – "Invisible" (Director of Photography: Jeff Cutter)

Best Video Game Soundtrack
Marc Eckō's Getting Up: Contents Under Pressure (Atari)
 Burnout Revenge (Electronic Arts)
 Driver: Parallel Lines (Atari)
 Fight Night Round 3 (Electronic Arts)
 NBA 2K6" (2K Games)

Best Video Game Score
Elder Scrolls IV: Oblivion (Composer: Jeremy Soule)
 Dreamfall: The Longest Journey (Composer: Leon Willett)
 Electroplankton (Composer: user generated soundtrack)
 Hitman: Blood Money (Composer: Jesper Kyd)
 Ghost Recon: Advanced Warfighter (Composer: Tom Salta)

Ringtone of the Year
Fort Minor (featuring Holly Brook) – "Where'd You Go"
 The Black Eyed Peas – "My Humps"
 Bubba Sparxxx (featuring Ying Yang Twins) – "Ms. New Booty"
 Nelly (featuring Paul Wall) – "Grillz"
 Kanye West (featuring Jamie Foxx) – "Gold Digger"

MTV2 Award
Thirty Seconds to Mars – "The Kill"
 Lil Wayne – "Fireman"
 Taking Back Sunday – "MakeDamnSure"
 Three 6 Mafia (featuring Young Buck, 8Ball and MJG) – "Stay Fly"
 Yung Joc (featuring Nitti) – "It's Goin' Down"

Viewer's Choice
Fall Out Boy – "Dance, Dance"
 Chris Brown (featuring Juelz Santana) – "Run It!"
 Kelly Clarkson – "Because of You"
 Rihanna – "SOS"
 Shakira (featuring Wyclef Jean) – "Hips Don't Lie"

Michael Jackson Video Vanguard Award
Hype Williams

Performances

Pre-show
 Fergie – "London Bridge"
 My Chemical Romance – "Welcome to the Black Parade"

Main show
 Justin Timberlake (featuring Timbaland) – "My Love"/"SexyBack"
 The Raconteurs and Lou Reed - "White Light/White Heat"       
 Shakira ft. Wyclef Jean - " Hips Don't Lie "                                                           
 Ludacris (featuring Pharrell and the Pussycat Dolls) – "Money Maker"
 OK Go – "Here It Goes Again"
 The All-American Rejects – "Move Along"
 Beyoncé – "Ring the Alarm"
 T.I. (featuring Young Dro) – "Shoulder Lean"/"What You Know"
 Panic! at the Disco – "I Write Sins Not Tragedies"
 Busta Rhymes – "Put Your Hands Where My Eyes Could See"
 Missy Elliott – "The Rain (Supa Dupa Fly)"
 Christina Aguilera – "Hurt"
 Tenacious D – "Friendship Song"
 The Killers – "Enterlude"/"When You Were Young"

Appearances

Pre-show
 The Black Eyed Peas – introduced Fergie's performance

Main show
 Jay-Z – opened the show
 Montel Williams, Justin Timberlake and Michael Bloomberg – made brief appearances during Jack Black's opening sequence
 Lil' Kim – presented Best Male Video
 André 3000 and Ciara – presented Best Hip-Hop Video
 The Rock – introduced Shakira and Wyclef Jean
 The cast of Jackass Number Two (Johnny Knoxville, Bam Margera, Steve-O, Chris Pontius, Ryan Dunn, Wee Man, Dave England, Preston Lacy, and Ehren McGhehey) – appeared in different vignettes about Viewer's Choice voting, and later on presented Viewer's Choice
 50 Cent and LL Cool J – presented Best Female Video
 Lil Jon (with E-40) – introduced Pharrell and Ludacris
 Sarah Silverman – appeared in backstage skits and coverage, and later performed a stand-up routine
 Kyle Gass – appeared in a couple of on-stage sequences with Jack Black and The Black Eyed Peas
 Jessica Simpson – presented Best Dance Video
 Chris Brown – introduced OK Go
 Shaun White – introduced as of the Jackass Number Two cast's vignettes
 Paris Hilton – introduced The All-American Rejects
 Nick Lachey and Nicole Richie – presented Best Pop Video
 Snoop Dogg – presented Best Rap Video
 Diddy – introduced T.I.
 Amy Lee (of Evanescence) and Jared Leto (of Thirty Seconds to Mars) – presented Best Group Video
 Ne-Yo and Rihanna – presented Ringtone of the Year
 Fall Out Boy – introduced Panic! at the Disco
 Fergie – introduced Abigail Breslin and presented Best New Artist in a Video with her
 Jim Shearer and EBRO – presented the MTV2 Award (only seen on the MTV2 simulcast of the ceremony)
 Britney Spears and Kevin Federline (via satellite) – presented Best R&B Video
 Kanye West – presented the Video Vanguard Award
 Pink and Lou Reed – presented Best Rock Video
 The Black Eyed Peas – appeared in an on-stage sequence with Kyle Gass (presenting a fake award), which led to Tenacious D's "reunion" and performance
 Queen Latifah – introduced Al Gore
 Al Gore – spoke about global warming and the world's environmental crisis
 Jennifer Lopez – announced the launch of MTV Tr3́s and presented Video of the Year
 Axl Rose – introduced The Killers
 Also, MTV VJs Vanessa Minnillo and John Norris appeared before and after some commercial breaks to remind viewers to check out MTV Overdrive's backstage VMA coverage

Contests

VMA Karaoke Contest
In this contest, participants picked one of three songs and made a video of themselves singing their choice. Winners received a paid trip to the 2006 MTV Video Music Awards.

VMA Insider Contest
The winner selected by voters at mtv.com  received a paid trip to the 2006 MTV Video Music Awards, and was allowed to interview all the stars on the red carpet.

"Reveal the Real You" Contest
Participants sent in a story of "a moment in their life that makes them, them." Winners received an all-expenses-paid trip to the 2006 MTV Video Music Awards, as well as the chance to win a trip to the VMAs in 2007.

See also
 2006 MTV Europe Music Awards

References

External links
 Official VMA site
 Official MTV site

2006
MTV Video Music Awards
MTV Video Music Awards
MTV Video Music Awards